Sergi Gestí Cano (born 14 February 1994) is a Spanish footballer who plays for UE Valls as a winger.

Club career
Born in Valls, Tarragona, Catalonia, Gestí began his footballing career on Gimnàstic de Tarragona's youth ranks. He made his debut on 3 June 2012, against Elche CF, after coming off the bench to replace Mairata.

In the 2013 summer Gestí was assigned to the farm team in Tercera División. On 4 July of the following year he renewed his link.

On 30 July 2015 Gestí moved to FC Vilafranca, also in the fourth level. The following year he returned to Pobla, after their relegation from Segunda División B.

On 3 January 2018, Gestí moved to UE Castelldefels also in the fourth division. He continued to appear in the category in the following years, representing Vilafranca, Castelldefels and UE Valls.

References

External links
Gimnàstic profile 

1994 births
Living people
Spanish footballers
Footballers from Catalonia
Association football wingers
Segunda División players
Tercera División players
Gimnàstic de Tarragona footballers
CF Pobla de Mafumet footballers